The Resistance Patriots Maï-Maï is a political party in the Democratic Republic of Congo. The party won 4 out of 500 seats in the 2006 parliamentary elections.

References

Political parties in the Democratic Republic of the Congo